October 17 - Eastern Orthodox liturgical calendar - October 19

All fixed commemorations below celebrated on October 31 by Eastern Orthodox Churches on the Old Calendar.

For October 18th, Orthodox Churches on the Old Calendar commemorate the Saints listed on October 5.

Saints
 Holy Apostle and Evangelist Luke (1st century)
 Hieromartyr Mnason of Cyprus, Bishop, by the sword (1st century)
 Holy 40 children-martyrs, by the sword.
 Hieromartyr Cyriacus (Kyriakos), Chorepiscopus of Jerusalem (c. 363)  (see also: October 28 )
 Martyr Marinus the Elder, at Anazarbus (4th century)
 Venerable Julian the Hermit (Julian Sabas)), of the Euphrates, in Mesopotamia (4th century)
 Venerables Symeon and Theodore of Thessaloniki, founders of the Mega Spilaion Monastery in Kalavryta, and Euphrosyne the shepherdess who found the Icon of the Mother of God, Wonderworkers (4th century)

Pre-Schism Western saints
 Saint Justus of Beauvais, a child-martyr aged nine, he was venerated in Beauvais in France (287)
 Saint Tryphonia, a widow martyred in Rome (3rd century)
 Saint Gwen (Candida or Blanche), a holy woman murdered by heathen in Talgarth in Wales, daughter of St. Brychan (492)
 Saints Gwen (Wenna) and Selevan (Saloman), martyred Welsh missionaries, in Brittany (5th century)
 Saints Brothen and Gwendolen (6th century)
 Saint Monon, hermit in the Ardennes (c. 645)
 Saint James the Deacon, companion of St Paulinus of York in his mission to Northumbria (after 671)  (see also: August 17 )

Post-Schism Orthodox saints
 Saint David of Serpukhov, Abbot (1520)
 New Martyrs Gabriel and Cirmidol, of Egypt (1522)
 New martyr Chryse (Zlata) of Meglen (1795)  (see also: October 13 )
 Saint Peter of Montenegro, Metropolitan of Cetinje (1830)
 New Hieromartyr Isidore, and his two children George and Irene, martyred under the Ottomans, newly revealed in 1953.<ref>Holy New Martyrs Isidore and his Two Children, Newly Revealed in 1953. Mystagogy. October 24, 2016. Retrieved 6 March, 2017.</ref>

New Martys and Confessors
 New Hieromartyrs Andrey Voskresensky, Sergius Bazhanov, Nicholas Sokolov and Sergius Gusev, Priests (1937)
 Virgin-martyr Elizabeth Krymova (1937)

Other commemorations
 Synaxis of the Icon of Panagia of Machairas Monastery (Panagia Machairiotissa) in Cyprus, one of the 70 icons of her written by the Apostle Luke.The Monastery of Panagia of Machairas in Cyprus. Mystagogy. November 21, 2011. Retrieved 6 March, 2017.
 Translation of the relics (2001) of Venerable Joseph of Volokolamsk (1515), founder of Volokolamsk Monastery.
 1997 slaying of José Muñoz Cortés (in monasticism, Monk Ambrose), guardian of the myrrh-streaming "Montreal" copy of the Panagia Portaitissa icon

Icon gallery

Notes

References

 Sources 
 October 18/31. Orthodox Calendar (PRAVOSLAVIE.RU).
 October 31 / October 18. HOLY TRINITY RUSSIAN ORTHODOX CHURCH (A parish of the Patriarchate of Moscow).
 October 18. OCA - The Lives of the Saints.
 The Autonomous Orthodox Metropolia of Western Europe and the Americas (ROCOR). St. Hilarion Calendar of Saints for the year of our Lord 2004. St. Hilarion Press (Austin, TX). p. 77.
 The Eighteenth Day of the Month of October. Orthodoxy in China.
 October 18. Latin Saints of the Orthodox Patriarchate of Rome.
 The Roman Martyrology. Transl. by the Archbishop of Baltimore. Last Edition, According to the Copy Printed at Rome in 1914. Revised Edition, with the Imprimatur of His Eminence Cardinal Gibbons. Baltimore: John Murphy Company, 1916. pp. 321–322.
 Rev. Richard Stanton. A Menology of England and Wales, or, Brief Memorials of the Ancient British and English Saints Arranged According to the Calendar, Together with the Martyrs of the 16th and 17th Centuries. London: Burns & Oates, 1892. pp. 502–503.
Greek Sources
 Great Synaxaristes:  18 ΟΚΤΩΒΡΙΟΥ. ΜΕΓΑΣ ΣΥΝΑΞΑΡΙΣΤΗΣ.
  Συναξαριστής. 18 Οκτωβρίου. ECCLESIA.GR. (H ΕΚΚΛΗΣΙΑ ΤΗΣ ΕΛΛΑΔΟΣ).
  18/10/2017.'' Ορθόδοξος Συναξαριστής. 
Russian Sources
  31 октября (18 октября). Православная Энциклопедия под редакцией Патриарха Московского и всея Руси Кирилла (электронная версия). (Orthodox Encyclopedia - Pravenc.ru).
  18 октября по старому стилю / 31 октября по новому стилю. Русская Православная Церковь - Православный церковный календарь на 2016 год.

October in the Eastern Orthodox calendar